Mount Horeb High School is a public high school located in Mount Horeb, Wisconsin, and is a part of the Mount Horeb Area School District. Mount Horeb High School serves 772 students in Mount Horeb, and Blue Mounds. The High School's mascot is the Vikings. Cody Lundquist is the principal as of 2020.

The school was opened in 1919.  Its current building was built in 1961.

References

Public high schools in Wisconsin
Schools in Dane County, Wisconsin
Educational institutions established in 1919
1919 establishments in Wisconsin